Modern Russia (the Russian Federation) has many symbols. Some of these symbols remain from historical periods such as the Tsarist era or Soviet Union, while others have ancient origins.

The Russian Russian Federation has several official national symbols including a historical document, a flag, an emblem, an anthem. The current design of the national flag is same of Russian Empire and was officially adopted again after the  dissolution of the Soviet Union.

Emblems and symbols

Soviet era 

 State Anthem of the Soviet Union
 Flag of RSFSR
 Victory Banner
 Hammer and sickle
 Red star

See also 

 List of cultural icons of Russia